
The following is a list of Playboy Playmates of 2005.  Playboy magazine names its Playmate of the Month each month throughout the year.

January

 
Destiny Davis is an American businesswoman and current executive of a real estate investment group in California. She received undergraduate degrees in economics and business law at the University of Nevada, Las Vegas as well as an MBA in Finance from Pepperdine University. While selling residential real estate, Davis appeared on Million Dollar Listing. In her late teens and early twenties, she was a model, and appeared in several episodes of the E! reality television series The Girls Next Door.

February

Amber Campisi  is an American model. She is Playboy's Playmate of the Month for February 2005. Campisi tried out for Playboy scouts when they were searching for models for The 50th Anniversary Playmate Hunt. She appeared in the accompanying pictorial in the December 2003.

March
 
Jillian Grace (born Jillian Grace Harper December 20, 1985 in Conway, Arkansas) is an American model and actress. She is Playboy magazine's Playmate of the Month for March 2005.

On August 26, 2008, Grace gave birth to a daughter named Harper; the father is actor David Spade. As of 2019, Grace and her daughter live outside St. Louis, Missouri.

April

Courtney Rachel Culkin  is an American model. She is Playboy magazine's Playmate of the Month for April 2005. Culkin tried out for Playboy scouts when they were searching for models for The 50th Anniversary Playmate Hunt. She appeared in the accompanying pictorial in the December 2003 issue. Her centerfold was photographed by Arny Freytag.

Playmate Data Sheet, April 2005

May

Jamie Westenhiser  is an American model from Florida. She was the Playboy Playmate of the Month for May 2005. Prior to becoming a Playmate, she was a member of the National Bikini Team (NBT) and a Hawaiian Tropic model.

June

Kara Monaco (born February 26, 1983, in Lakeland, Florida) is an American model. She is Playboy magazine's Playmate of the Month for June, 2005. She appeared on the cover of the June 2006 issue of Playboy as the 2006 Playmate of the Year.

July

Qiana Chase   is an American model. She is Playboy's Playmate of the Month for July 2005.  Chase tried out for Playboy scouts during The 50th Anniversary Playmate Hunt. She appeared in the accompanying pictorial in the December 2003 issue.

August

Tamara Witmer  is an American model, actress and reality television star. She is best known as Playboy's Playmate of the Month, Miss August 2005, and was also the cover girl for the October 2006 issue.

September

Vanessa Hoelsher  is Playboys Playmate of the Month for September 2005.

October

Amanda Paige (born Amanda Paige Blair October 28, 1984) also known as Amanda Paige Gellar and Paige Gellar, is an American attorney and former model. She was Playboys Playmate of the Month for October 2005, and was the cover model for the September 2007 issue.  She received a B.A. in sociology from the University of Virginia in 2006 and received a J.D. from the University of Richmond School of Law in 2012.  She is admitted to practice law in Virginia.

November

Raquel Gibson  is an American model and actress of Filipino and Italian descent. Gibson is Playboy magazine's Playmate of the Month for November 2005. Gibson has a culinary school degree from Chef Jean Pierre Cooking School in Florida and speaks Tagalog and Japanese. Her older sister, CJ Gibson, is also a model.

December

Christine Smith  is Playboys Playmate of the Month for December, 2005. In October 2008, Smith appeared in a presidential election spoof video for Funny or Die.com. In 2011, she played a minor role in the movie Bad Teacher.

See also
 List of people in Playboy 2000–2009

References

2005-related lists
2005
Playmates Of 2005